Lamp Lit Prose is the eighth studio album by American experimental rock group Dirty Projectors, and was released on Domino Records on July 13, 2018.

Production 
The album was produced by David Longstreth at his Los Angeles studio.

Release 
The band supported the album with a tour, which began in May 2018 with significant personnel changes.

They released the first single off the album, "Break-Thru", on May 2 along with a music video. In Spin, Andy Cush described the single as sounding "more immediately Dirty Projectors-ish than anything on the self-titled album" released in 2017.

On June 14, they released a second single, "That's a Lifestyle", with an animated music video by Kitty Faingold. In Stereogum, Chris DeVille also contrasted this single with the tenor of Dirty Projectors, saying "That's A Lifestyle" echoed earlier albums "Bitte Orca and Swing Lo Magellan, the pop-minded prog exercises that transformed Dirty Projectors from underground oddities to full-fledged indie rock stars. It's a magnificently pretty guitar tapestry that never lets its complexity smother the pop appeal."

On July 12, the day before the album's release, the band released their third single, "I Feel Energy".

Reception

At Metacritic, which assigns a weighted average rating out of 100 to reviews from mainstream publications, this release received an average score of 77, based on 27 reviews.
At Rolling Stone, Will Hermes called the album "a flood of ideas and magnificent vocal arrangements" which he found "by turns dazzling and exhausting." Jazz Monroe of Pitchfork praised the album's "more hopeful, chipper kind of songwriting."

Track listing

Personnel
Musicians

 David Longstreth – acoustic guitar , 12-string guitar , electric guitar , Juno , Rhodes , vocals , piano , drums , drum production , guitars , Wurlitzer , string arrangement , bass , horn arrangement , organ 
 Syd – vocals 
 Lorely Rodriguez (Empress Of) – additional vocals , vocals 
 Teresa Eggers – additional vocals 
 Mauro Refosco – surdo , percussion 
 Tyondai Braxton – modular processing 
 Todd Simon – trumpet , cornet , flugelhorn , French horn , euphonium 
 Tracy Wannomae – tenor saxophone , baritone saxophone , bass clarinet , recorder , alto saxophone 
 Mike Johnson – drums 
 Benjamin Jacobson – violin 
 Andrew Bulbrook – violin 
 Jonathan Moerschel – viola 
 Eric Byers – cello 
 Danielle Haim – vocals 
 Alana Haim – vocals 
 Este Haim – vocals 
 Amber Mark – vocals 
 Juliane Graf – trombone , bass trombone , tuba 
 Björk – higurashi recording 
 Daniel Luna – güira 
 Francisco Javier Paredes – bongos 
 Nat Baldwin – bass 
 Robin Pecknold – vocals 
 Rostam Batmanglij – vocals 
 Katy Davidson (Dear Nora) – vocals 

Technical

 David Longstreth – mixing 
 Manny Marroquin – mixing 
 Greg Calbi – mastering
 Sonny DiPerri – drum engineering , percussion engineering , guitar engineering 
 David Tolomei – drum engineering , string engineering , horn engineering , percussion engineering , piano engineering 
 Miro Mackie – vocal engineering , piano engineering , guitar engineering 
 Ryan Tuttle – guitar, Wurlitzer and Rhodes engineering , piano engineering 
 Robby Moncrieff – guitar engineering , Rhodes and Wurlitzer engineering , bass and organ engineering , additional engineering 
 Nikolaj Nielsen – Robin Pecknold's vocal engineering 
 Logan Patrick – Rostam Batmanglij's vocal engineering 

Artwork

 David Longstreth – art direction
 Joe Cariati – glass sculptures
 Jason Frank Rothenberg – photography
 Kelsey Fugere – prop styling
 Teresa Eggers – prop styling
 Rob Carmichael (Seen) – design

Charts

References

2018 albums
Dirty Projectors albums
Domino Recording Company albums
Albums produced by David Longstreth